David Collins (born October 12, 1969) is an American rower and Olympic bronze medalist. He was born in Thousand Oaks, California. A seven-time national rowing champion, Dave won a bronze medal at the 1996 Olympics as a member of the U.S. rowing team. Dave also received a gold medal at the 1995 Pan American Games and a bronze medal at the 1991 World Rowing Championships. Dave was inducted into the United States National Rowing Hall of Fame and Rutgers University’s Olympic Hall of Fame. He graduated with honors from Rutgers College of Engineering and completed his graduate degree in secondary education at Old Dominion University’s Darden College of Education.

In addition to teaching mathematics in public high schools, Dave has worked for the North Carolina Department of Education evaluating and authoring future state assessments. He also wrote a research paper to aid new teachers with peer relations within a multicultural classroom as part of a U.S. Department of Education study. Dave is a member of VAIS's Professional Development Advisory Commission. He has also coached both high school and college crew, including the Rutgers and Georgetown University teams.

References 
 
 

1969 births
Living people
People from Thousand Oaks, California
Rowers at the 1996 Summer Olympics
Olympic bronze medalists for the United States in rowing
American male rowers
World Rowing Championships medalists for the United States
Medalists at the 1996 Summer Olympics
Pan American Games medalists in rowing
Pan American Games gold medalists for the United States
Sportspeople from Ventura County, California
Rowers at the 1995 Pan American Games